Kangeelu or Kangilu is a traditional folk dance of particular significance to the Udupi and Karnataka communities of India. It is a spiritual form of dance performed by the Mandal community. Kangilu is performed only on the day of a full moon, and it is believed to keep away disease, evil spirits, and other negative energy, and to foster peace, harmony, and a community spirit. Kangeelu is not purely dancing, but a dance act. There are 5–12 members in the group wearing the same costumes and makeup.

See also
List of Indian folk dances

References

Indian folk dances
Culture of Karnataka